The Providence Friars represented Providence College in Women's Hockey East Association play during the 2015–16 NCAA Division I women's ice hockey season.

Offseason
July 1: 13 Players named to WHEA All Scholastic Team

Recruiting

Roster

2015–16 Friars

Schedule

|-
!colspan=12 style=""| Regular Season

|-
!colspan=12 style=""| WHEA Tournament

Awards and honors
Christina Putigna was named to the 2016 Hockey East Pro Ambitions  All-Rookie Team

References

Providence
Providence Friars women's ice hockey